Landscape After the Battle is a 1970 Polish drama film directed by Andrzej Wajda and starring Daniel Olbrychski; telling a story of a Nazi German concentration camp survivor soon after liberation, residing in a DP camp somewhere in Germany. It is based on the writings of Holocaust survivor and Polish author Tadeusz Borowski. In most part, the plot revolves around the events depicted in Borowski's short story called "Bitwa pod Grunwaldem" ("The Battle of Grunwald") from his collection This Way for the Gas, Ladies and Gentlemen. The film was entered into the 1970 Cannes Film Festival.

Plot
The Landscape After the Battle film tells a story of two young concentration camp survivors. In the opening sequence, Vivaldi's “Autumn” can be heard while the prisoners are liberated. A young Polish poet, Tadeusz, is asked by a pretty Jewish girl, Nina, to go with her to the West. His camp experience, however, prevents him from realizing the depth of her love for him, and he is reluctant to commit. Nina is accidentally shot dead by an American soldier, causing Tadeusz to cry for the first time in years. The shock of her death brings back the world of feelings suppressed by his Nazi captors, and allows for his original creativity to reemerge. The credits appear to the sound of Vivaldi's “Winter”.

Cast
 Daniel Olbrychski - Tadeusz
 Stanisława Celińska - Nina
 Aleksander Bardini - Professor
 Tadeusz Janczar - Karol
 Zygmunt Malanowicz - Priest
 Mieczysław Stoor - Ensign
 Leszek Drogosz - Tolek
 Stefan Friedmann - Gypsy
 Jerzy Oblamski - Prisoner
 Jerzy Zelnik - American Commandant
 Małgorzata Braunek - German Girl
 Anna German - American Woman
 Agnieszka Perepeczko - Nina's Friend
 Alina Szpak - German Woman
 Józef Pieracki - Cook

See also
 The Holocaust in Poland

References

External links
  Krajobraz po bitwie (Landscape After The Battle) at www.wajda.pl

1970 films
1970 drama films
Polish drama films
1970s Polish-language films
Films directed by Andrzej Wajda